NTL is a C++ library for doing number theory. NTL supports arbitrary length integer and arbitrary precision floating point arithmetic, finite fields, vectors, matrices, polynomials, lattice basis reduction and basic linear algebra. NTL is free software released under the GNU Lesser General Public License v2.1.

References

External links
 Official NTL website

C++ libraries
Free mathematics software
2015 software